Martyn Clayton is a British author of Roma : A People On The Edge (Braiswick 2003) a non-fiction book exploring the history and current situation of the Roma Gypsy peoples worldwide and a novel, Take Me Out (Subculture Books 2008).

References

Living people
English writers
Year of birth missing (living people)
Place of birth missing (living people)